Miguel de Benavides y Añoza, O.P. (c. 1552 – July 26, 1605) was a Spanish clergyman and sinologist who was the third Archbishop of Manila. He previously served as the first Bishop of the Diocese of Nueva Segovia, and was the founder of the University of Santo Tomas in Manila.

Biography
Miguel de Benavides was born in 1552, to a noble family in Carrión de los Condes, Spain. He entered the Dominican Order in San Pablo de la Moraleja, Valladolid, and later rendered service in Colegio de San Gregorio.

He joined the first group of Dominicans going to Manila in 1587, proceeding with them on to China where he hoped to expand the local Catholic church. He was later exiled, and established a hospital for the Chinese in Binondo, Manila, before becoming the head of his order. He accompanied Bishop Domingo de Salazar, the first bishop of Manila, to Spain to defend the native Filipinos against Spanish oppression.

Bishop
He was appointed as the first bishop of Nueva Segovia and was consecrated in Mexico in 1597. He authored the Doctrina Christiana in Chinese, one of the earliest books printed in the Philippines. He arrived in Nueva Segovia in 1599 but was, after three years, appointed as the Archbishop of Manila on October 7, 1602. His installation in Manila was financed by King Philip III himself, for Benavides was extremely poor. On September 9, 1603, he directed the Franciscans to oversee the Japanese staying in the Philippines. In the same year, he warned the government about the nascent revolt of the Chinese population although he was also criticized for inciting it with his sermons.

Death
He died on July 26, 1605 in Manila.

His library and personal property worth ₱1,500 were donated for the establishment of an institution of higher learning, now known as the University of Santo Tomas.

See also
 Roman Catholic Archdiocese of Manila
 Roman Catholic Archdiocese of Nueva Segovia
 University of Santo Tomas
 Miguel de Benavides Library
 History of University of Santo Tomas
 Roman Catholicism in the Philippines
 First book of the Spanish Philippines

References

External links and additional sources
 (for Chronology of Bishops) 
 (for Chronology of Bishops) 
 Miguel de Benavides Library - University of Santo Tomas
 Roman Catholic Archdiocese of Manila - Official website
 Manila Metropolitan Cathedral  - Official website

1552 births
1605 deaths
People from Carrión de los Condes
Spanish Roman Catholics
University of Santo Tomas
Spanish sinologists
Roman Catholic archbishops of Manila
Dominican bishops
17th-century Roman Catholic bishops in the Philippines
Roman Catholic bishops of Nueva Segovia
Roman Catholic Archdiocese of Manila